Santo Tomas, officially the Municipality of Santo Tomas, is a 4th class municipality in the province of Isabela, Philippines. According to the 2020 census, it has a population of 24,528 people.

In 1952, Santo Tomas lost two barrios when the barrios of Abut and Minagbag were transferred to the newly created town of Mallig. In 1961, those barrios were transferred to the newly created municipality of Quezon.

Geography 
Santo Tomas is a landlocked municipality situated in the northern portion of the province of Isabela. It is bounded to the west by Quezon, to the south by Delfin Albano, to the southeast by Tumauini, to the north and northeast by Cabagan and the Cagayan River.

Barangays
Santo Tomas is politically subdivided into 27 barangays. These barangays are headed by elected officials: Barangay Captain, Barangay Council, whose members are called Barangay Councilors. All are elected every three years.

Climate

Demographics

Economy 

Farming is its primary source of income. The most widespread plantations were rice, corn and tobacco farms. Locals also raise livestock for extra income.

Government

Local government
The municipality is governed by a mayor designated as its local chief executive and by a municipal council as its legislative body in accordance with the Local Government Code. The mayor, vice mayor, and the councilors are elected directly by the people through an election which is being held every three years.

Elected officials

Congress representation
Santo Tomas, belonging to the first legislative district of the province of Isabela, currently represented by Hon. Antonio T. Albano.

Education
The Schools Division of Isabela governs the town's public education system. The division office is a field office of the DepEd in Cagayan Valley region. The office governs the public and private elementary and public and  private high schools throughout the municipality.

References

External links

 Municipal Profile at the National Competitiveness Council of the Philippines
Santo Tomas at the Isabela Government Website
Local Governance Performance Management System
[ Philippine Standard Geographic Code]
Philippine Census Information
Municipality of Santo Tomas

Municipalities of Isabela (province)
Populated places on the Rio Grande de Cagayan